Pain is a distressing feeling often caused by intense or damaging stimuli.

Pain may also refer to:

Arts
 "Pain", a season one episode of Stargate Universe
 "Pain", an episode of The Good Doctor
 Pain (film), a 1953 Mexican-Spanish musical comedy film
 Pain (journal), a monthly peer-reviewed medical journal
 Pain (video game), an action video game developed by Idol Minds and published by Sony Computer Entertainment for PlayStation 3
 The Pain – When Will It End?, a cartoon drawn by Tim Kreider

Characters
 Nagato (Naruto) (also Pain), fictional character in the manga and anime series Naruto
 Pain, a demon from the Disney animated feature Hercules
 The Pain, a character from the Metal Gear franchise

Music

Albums
 Pain (Ohio Players album), the second studio album by The Ohio Players
 Pain (Rhino Bucket album), the third studio album released by the hard rock band Rhino Bucket
 Pain, album by Dub War

Groups
 Pain (musical project), a musical project from Sweden that mixes heavy metal with influences from electronic music and techno
 Salvo (band) (previously Pain), an American punk rock group

Songs
 "Pain" (De La Soul song), 2016
 "Pain" (Jimmy Eat World song), 2004
 "Pain" (Three Days Grace song), the second single from rock band Three Days Grace's 2006 album, One-X
 "Pain", a 1994 song by 2Pac from the film Above the Rim but withheld from the soundtrack
 "Pain", the third track from Alice Cooper's 1980 album Flush the Fashion
 "Pain", the sixth track from Blackfield's 2004 album Blackfield
 "Pain", a song by Boy Harsher
 "Pain", a 2001 single by Four Star Mary
 "Pain", the eleventh track from Fun Factory's 1994 album NonStop
 "Pain", the first track from Hollywood Undead's 2009 EP Swan Songs B-Sides
 "Pain", a 2001 single by the Indigo
"Pain", a 2021 single by PinkPantheress
 "Pain", the sixth track from Kittie's 2001 album Oracle
 "Pain", by King Princess, 2020
 "Pain", by Ingrid Andress, 2022
 "The Pain", by Lacuna Coil from their 2009 album Shallow Life
 "Pain", the ninth track from Oingo Boingo's 1987 album Boi-ngo
 "Pain", the eleventh track from Puff Daddy's 1997 album No Way Out
 "Pain", the 13th track from Puff Daddy's 1999 album Forever
 "Pain", the second track from Soulfly's 2000 album Primitive
 "Pain", the sixth track from Stereomud's 2001 album Perfect Self
 "Pain", a bonus track from the Used's 2007 album Lies for the Liars
 "Pain", the 2020 debut single from Nessa Barrett

People
 Pain fitzJohn (died 1137), Anglo-Norman nobleman and administrator
 Angie Hulley (born 1962), English retired female long-distance runner
 Connor Pain (born 1993), Australian professional football player
 Elizabeth Pain (1704), settler in colonial Boston
 Jeff Pain (born 1970), American-born Canadian former skeleton racer
 T-Pain (born 1985), American rapper, singer, songwriter and record producer

Places
 Deh-e Pain, Lamerd (also Pā’īn), a village in Kal Rural District, Eshkanan District, Lamerd County, Fars Province, Iran
 Pain, Kerman, a village in Gevar Rural District, Sarduiyeh District, Jiroft County, Kerman Province, Iran
 McKinley National Park Airport (ICAO code: PAIN), a public-use airport located two nautical miles northeast of McKinley Park

Other
 P.A.I.N., an advocacy organization founded by Nan Goldin to respond to the opioid crisis
 Pain (philosophy), a topic in philosophy
 Payment Initialization, an electronic message type group within ISO 20022 known for its usage within the Single Euro Payments Area
 Suffering, an experience of unpleasantness and aversion associated with the perception of harm or threat of harm in an individual

See also
 Pain and Suffering (disambiguation)
 Paine (disambiguation)
 Pains (disambiguation)
 Pan (disambiguation)
 Pane (disambiguation)
 Payne (disambiguation)